Valley of the Temples can refer to:

 Valley of the Temples (Sicily)
 Valley of the Temples Memorial Park, Hawaii